The Hofstra Labor and Employment Law Journal is an American law journal which publishes articles in the field of labor and employment law.

The journal was founded as the Hofstra Labor Law Journal in 1982.
It publishes articles on labor law and employment relations, covering issues such as the National Labor Relations Act, employment discrimination, termination, sexual harassment, the Americans With Disabilities Act, work for hire, whistleblower and retaliatory discharge, workplace and union governance, dispute resolution and other topics.

The target audience for the journal comprises legal scholars, practicing attorneys, and students.

The journal is published two times a year by the Hofstra University School of Law.

See also
Hofstra Law Review

References 
https://books.lawin.org/hofstra-labor-employment-law-journal/
https://www.worldcat.org/title/hofstra-labor-employment-law-journal/oclc/1010527911

External links 
 Official webpage
 Hofstra University School of Law

American law journals
Labour law journals
Publications established in 1982
Hofstra University
United States labor law
1982 establishments in New York (state)
Law journals edited by students
Biannual journals